The 2022–23 New Zealand Breakers season was the 20th season of the franchise in the National Basketball League (NBL), and their first under the leadership of their new head coach Mody Maor.

Roster

Standings

Ladder 

The NBL tie-breaker system as outlined in the NBL Rules and Regulations states that in the case of an identical win–loss record, the overall points percentage will determine order of seeding.

Ladder progression

Game log

Pre-season 

|-style="background:#BBF3BB;"
| 1
| 10 September 
| Illawarra
| W 71–68 (OT)
| Izayah Le'afa (16)
| Dererk Pardon (12)
| Will McDowell-White (5)
| The Stockyard600
| 1–0

NBL Blitz 

|-style="background:#FFBBBB;"
| 1
| 18 September
| @ Brisbane
| L 81–69
| Tom Vodanovich (15)
| Jarrell Brantley (8)
| Izayah Le'afa (4)
| Darwin Basketball Facility932
| 0–1
|-style="background:#FFBBBB;"
| 2
| 20 September
| Illawarra
| L 81–85
| Rayan Rupert (17)
| Dererk Pardon (9)
| Izayah Le'afa (9)
| Darwin Basketball Facility660
| 0–2
|-style="background:#FFBBBB;"
| 3
| 23 September
| Sydney
| L 93–101
| Barry Brown (19)
| Pardon, Rupert (5)
| Brown, Le'afa (4)
| Darwin Basketball Facility905
| 0–3

Regular season 

|-style="background:#FFBBBB;"
| 1 
| 2 October
| @ Melbourne
| L 101–97 (OT)
| Brown, Pardon (23)
| Will McDowell-White (13)
| Will McDowell-White (7)
| John Cain Arena7,236
| 0–1
|-style="background:#BBF3BB;"
| 2
| 7 October
| Tasmania
| W 71–65
| Jarrell Brantley (19)
| Loe, Pardon (7)
| Will McDowell-White (4)
| Spark Arena5,340
| 1–1
|-style="background:#BBF3BB;"
| 3
| 15 October
| @ S.E. Melbourne
| W 77–85
| Robert Loe (18)
| Will McDowell-White (7)
| Izayah Le'afa (10)
| John Cain Arena4,364
| 2–1
|-style="background:#BBF3BB;"
| 4
| 17 October
| @ Illawarra
| W 62–88
| Will McDowell-White (17)
| Will McDowell-White (10)
| Will McDowell-White (6)
| WIN Entertainment Centre2,208
| 3–1
|-style="background:#FFBBBB;"
| 5
| 20 October
| S.E. Melbourne
| L 77–99
| Jarrell Brantley (17)
| Robert Loe (8)
| Izayah Le'afa (4)
| The Trusts Arena2,288
| 3–2
|-style="background:#BBF3BB;"
| 6
| 23 October
| @ Cairns
| W 64–68
| Barry Brown Jr. (24)
| Pardon, Vodanovich (8)
| Will McDowell-White (4)
| Cairns Convention Centre4,091
| 4–2
|-style="background:#BBF3BB;"
| 7
| 28 October
| @ Adelaide
| W 70–99
| Brantley, Brown (22)
| Jarrell Brantley (9)
| Will McDowell-White (7)
| Adelaide Entertainment Centre6,717
| 5–2
|-style="background:#BBF3BB;"
| 8
| 30 October
| Tasmania
| W 94–62
| Barry Brown Jr. (24)
| Dererk Pardon (14)
| Will McDowell-White (7)
| Spark Arena3,811
| 6–2

|-style="background:#FFBBBB;"
| 9
| 6 November 
| Sydney
| L 77–81
| Barry Brown Jr. (22)
| Will McDowell-White (12)
| Izayah Le'afa (4)
| Spark Arena4,481
| 6–3
|-style="background:#BBF3BB;"
| 10
| 18 November 
| @ Tasmania
| W 76–84
| Dererk Pardon (19)
| Dererk Pardon (10)
| Will McDowell-White (6)
| Silverdome3,122
| 7–3
|-style="background:#BBF3BB;"
| 11
| 20 November
| Adelaide
| W 89–83
| Barry Brown Jr. (22)
| Brantley, Pardon (10)
| Will McDowell-White (7)
| The Trusts Arena2,909
| 8–3
|-style="background:#BBF3BB;"
| 12
| 25 November 
| @ Cairns
| W 71–82
| Brantley, Brown (20)
| Dererk Pardon (11)
| Will McDowell-White (8)
| Cairns Convention Centre3,661
| 9–3
|-style="background:#BBF3BB;"
| 13
| 27 November 
| Brisbane
| W 116–79
| Jarrell Brantley (29)
| Jarrell Brantley (8)
| Brantley, Gliddon, Le'afa (5)
| Spark Arena3,660
| 10–3

|-style="background:#BBF3BB;"
| 14
| 1 December 
| S.E. Melbourne
| W 110–84
| Barry Brown Jr. (31)
| Dererk Pardon (10)
| Will McDowell-White (11)
| Christchurch Arena3,500
| 11–3
|-style="background:#FFBBBB;"
| 15
| 3 December 
| Perth
| L 84–92
| Barry Brown Jr. (27)
| Dererk Pardon (14)
| Will McDowell-White (9)
| Spark Arena4,884
| 11–4
|-style="background:#FFBBBB;"
| 16
| 8 December 
| Sydney
| L 81–88
| Izayah Le'afa (17)
| Tom Vodanovich (9)
| Will McDowell-White (8)
| Spark Arena3,454
| 11–5
|- style="background:#CCCCCC;"
| –
| 16 December
| @ Perth
| colspan="6" | Postponed (COVID-19) (Makeup date: 10 January)
|- style="background:#CCCCCC;"
| –
| 21 December
| @ Brisbane
| colspan="6" | Postponed (COVID-19) (Makeup date: 4 February)
|-style="background:#FFBBBB;"
| 17
| 26 December 
| @ Tasmania 
| L 93–82
| Izayah Le'afa (21)
| Dererk Pardon (8)
| Izayah Le'afa (5)
| MyState Bank Arena4,269
| 11–6

|-style="background:#BBF3BB;"
| 18
| 4 January 
| Perth
| W 97–94
| Barry Brown Jr. (23)
| Abercrombie, Brantley (7)
| Barry Brown Jr. (6)
| TSB Stadium2,200
| 12–6
|-style="background:#BBF3BB;"
| 19
| 8 January 
| @ Adelaide 
| W 83–85
| Barry Brown Jr. (16)
| Dererk Pardon (7)
| Will McDowell-White (7)
| Adelaide Entertainment Centre9,368
| 13–6
|-style="background:#FFBBBB;"
| 20
| 10 January 
| @ Perth
| L 93–90
| Dererk Pardon (28)
| Dererk Pardon (12)
| Will McDowell-White (8)
| RAC Arena11,668
| 13–7
|-style="background:#FFBBBB;"
| 21
| 12 January 
| Melbourne
| L 65–77
| Jarrell Brantley (17)
| Will McDowell-White (8)
| Will McDowell-White (6)
| Christchurch Arena5,217
| 13–8
|-style="background:#FFBBBB"
| 22
| 15 January 
| Cairns
| L 83–85
| Will McDowell-White (29)
| Jarrell Brantley (14)
| Will McDowell-White (5)
| Spark Arena7,194
| 13–9
|-style="background:#FFBBBB;"
| 23
| 19 January 
| Illawarra
| L 76–78
| Dererk Pardon (19)
| Dererk Pardon (17)
| Will McDowell-White (7)
| Spark Arena3,967
| 13–10
|-style="background:#BBF3BB;"
| 24
| 22 January 
| @ Sydney
| W 88–93
| Jarrell Brantley (30)
| Jarrell Brantley (9)
| Will McDowell-White (10)
| Qudos Bank Arena14,232
| 14–10
|-style="background:#BBF3BB;"
| 25
| 26 January 
| @ Brisbane
| W 71–99
| Jarrell Brantley (22)
| Dererk Pardon (9)
| Rupert, McDowell-White (4)
| Nissan Arena3,636
| 15–10
|-style="background:#BBF3BB;"
| 26
| 28 January 
| Melbourne
| W 80–74
| Jarrell Brantley (18)
| Dererk Pardon (8)
| Will McDowell-White (6)
| Spark Arena6,488
| 16–10

|-style="background:#BBF3BB;"
| 27
| 2 February 
| @ Illawarra
| W 81–91
| Barry Brown Jr. (22)
| Abercrombie, Brantley (6)
| Le'afa, McDowell-White (4)
| WIN Entertainment Centre2,039
| 17–10
|-style="background:#BBF3BB;"
| 28
| 4 February 
| @ Brisbane
| W 75–80 (OT)
| Jarrell Brantley (19)
| Will McDowell-White (8)
| Will McDowell-White (9)
| Nissan Arena5,253
| 18–10

Postseason 

|-style="background:#BBF3BB;"
| 1
| 12 February 
| Tasmania
| W 88–68
| Dererk Pardon (15)
| Dererk Pardon (9)
| Will McDowell-White (7)
| Spark Arena5,479
| 1–0
|-style="background:#FFBBBB;"
| 2
| 16 February 
| @ Tasmania
| L 89–78
| Barry Brown Jr. (19)
| Dererk Pardon (11)
| Will McDowell-White (4)
| MyState Bank Arena4,293
| 1–1
|-style="background:#BBF3BB;"
| 3
| 19 February 
| Tasmania
| W 92–77
| Barry Brown Jr. (32)
| Dererk Pardon (14)
| Will McDowell-White (4)
| Spark Arena6,410
| 2–1

|-style="background:#BBF3BB;"
| 4
| 3 March
| @ Sydney
| W 87–95
| Brown, McDowell-White (19)
| Will McDowell-White (9)
| Will McDowell-White (9)
| Qudos Bank Arena13,145
| 3–1
|-style="background:#FFBBBB;"
| 5
| 5 March
| Sydney
| L 74–81
| Barry Brown Jr. (21)
| Dererk Pardon (11)
| Will McDowell-White (4)
| Spark Arena8,429
| 3–2
|-style="background:#FFBBBB;"
| 6
| 10 March
| @ Sydney
| L 91–68
| Will McDowell-White (11)
| Le'afa, McDowell-White (6)
| Brown, Le'afa (3)
| Qudos Bank Arena18,049
| 3–3
|-style="background:#BBF3BB;"
| 7
| 12 March
| Sydney
| W 80–60
| Jarrell Brantley (23)
| Loe, McDowell-White, Pardon (6)
| Will McDowell-White (5)
| Spark Arena9,742
| 4–3
|-style="background:#FFBBBB;"
| 6
| 15 March
| @ Sydney
| L 77–69
| Barry Brown Jr. (22)
| Pardon (9)
| Will McDowell-White (5)
| Qudos Bank Arena18,124
| 4–4

Transactions

Re-signed

Additions

Subtractions

Awards

Club awards 
 Club MVP: Jarrell Brantley
 Defensive Player: Dererk Pardon
 Fan's Memorable Moment: Jarrell Brantley
 Blackwell Community Cup: Junior Breakers staff 
 Clubman Award: Emily Nolan
 Member’s Choice Award: Barry Brown Jr.

See also 
 2022–23 NBL season
 New Zealand Breakers

References

External links 

 Official Website

New Zealand Breakers
New Zealand Breakers seasons
New Zealand Breakers season